Cabin Lake is a lake in Madera County, California, in the United States.

Cabin Lake was named for a cabin which stood nearby.

See also
List of lakes in California

References

Lakes of California
Lakes of Madera County, California
Lakes of Northern California